The Minnesota Boat Club Boathouse on Raspberry Island is a historic structure in Saint Paul, Minnesota, United States. It is the home of the Minnesota Boat Club, a rowing club founded in 1870, that is Minnesota's oldest athletic organization. In 1885, a wooden structure was built on Raspberry Island to house the Minnesota Boat Club. The club constructed a new boathouse in 1910, which was designed by George H. Carsley in the style of Mission Revival architecture. The boathouse building was listed on the National Register of Historic Places in 1982.

See also 

 History of Saint Paul, Minnesota
 Mississippi National River and Recreation Area
 Upper Mississippi River
Wabasha Street Bridge

References

External links
 
 Minnesota Boat Club

Boathouses in the United States
Clubhouses on the National Register of Historic Places in Minnesota
Mississippi National River and Recreation Area
National Register of Historic Places in Saint Paul, Minnesota
National Register of Historic Places in Mississippi National River and Recreation Area
Rowing clubs in the United States
Spanish Revival architecture in the United States
Sports clubs established in 1870
Sports in Minnesota
Sports venues completed in 1910
Boathouses on the National Register of Historic Places
Transportation buildings and structures on the National Register of Historic Places in Minnesota